Kolsar (also Romanized as Kal Sar; also known as Kalleh Sar, Koliser, and Kol Sar-e Bālā) is a village in Kasma Rural District, in the Central District of Sowme'eh Sara County, Gilan Province, Iran. At the 2006 census, its population was 424, in 117 families.

References 

Populated places in Sowme'eh Sara County